Vera Plevnik (c. 1955/195627 January 1982) was an Australian actress, born to Yugoslav-Russian parents best known for winning a Logie for her performance as a resistance fighter Nadia Grosse in the TV movie The John Sullivan Story, a spin-off of the TV series The Sullivans

She initially trained at teachers college, but chose acting, training at the Victorian College of the Arts. 

Plevnik died in a car crash near Batemans Bay when her late model Sedan hit another vehicle coming north from the Princes Highway, the 60 year old driver of the other vehicle also was killed .

She was a friend of James Reyne and her life inspired several of his songs.

Select credits
The Golden Oldies (1977) – play
The John Sullivan Story (1979) – TV movie
Young Ramsay (1980) – TV series – episode "The Littlest Goldmine"
The Same Stream (1981) – short
The Fame is Shared (1981) – live performance
Conundra (1982) – play
Monkey Grip (1982) – film
Going Down (1983) – film

References

External links

Vera Plevnik at AusStage

Australian television actresses
1955 births
1982 deaths
20th-century Australian actresses
Road incident deaths in New South Wales
Logie Award winners